Major General Muhammed Iftikhar Khan (10 January 1907 – 13 December 1949) was an officer of the British Indian Army and later Pakistan Army. He was the strongest contender to succeed General Douglas Gracey as the Commander-in-Chief, but unfortunately was killed in a plane crash before he took office.

Early life 
Iftikhar Khan belonged to the Minhas  Rajput clan of Chakwal. His father was Ressaidar Raja Fazal Dad Khan, who was a Zamindar, or landowner, and had served as a Viceroy's Commissioned Officer with a British Indian Army cavalry unit. Iftikhar had nine brothers and four sisters. Six, including Iftikhar, were in the army, including Major General Muhammed Akbar Khan, Major General Muhammad Anwar Khan, Brigadier Muhammad Afzal, Brigadier Muhammed Zafar Khan, and Brigadier Muhammad Yusuf Khan. The three other brothers Baqir Khan, Tahir Khan, and Masud Khan chose civilian careers.

Career 
After attending the Royal Military College, Sandhurst, on 29 August 1929 Iftikhar Khan was commissioned as a Second Lieutenant on the Unattached List for the Indian Army. He then spent a year on attachment to the 2nd battalion of the Manchester Regiment.

British Indian Army 
Khan transferred to the Indian Army on 16 October 1930 and was posted to the 7th Light Cavalry. He was promoted to Lieutenant on 29 November 1931.
He then transferred to the 3rd Cavalry on 1 October 1932, a regiment which was in the process of being Indianised. 
He was promoted to Captain on 29 August 1938 and served as regimental Quartermaster from 1 August 1937 to 18 April 1938, then as regimental Adjutant from 19 April 1938 to 5 August 1940. He was appointed a Staff Captain on 7 August 1940.

From 17 December 1941, Khan was attached to the No. 2 Indian Armoured Corps Training Center. By January 1943, he was a General Staff Officer Grade 2 on the staff of Headquarters Ceylon Army Command.

By July 1943 he was a local Lieutenant Colonel and a General Staff Officer Grade 2 at the Command and Staff College, Quetta. He was still in this role in April 1944.

In early 1945 he was a temporary Major and second in command of the 45th Cavalry, a war raised armoured unit then serving in Burma, later posted to the 7th Light Cavalry as temporary Major and second in command.

He was promoted to Major on 29 August 1946. He commanded the 7th Light Cavalry in Japan as part of the occupation forces from September to December 1946.

Pakistani Army 
On the Partition of India and independence of Pakistan in August 1947, Khan opted to join the new Pakistan Army. He was quickly promoted to Major General and on 1 January 1948 assumed the command of the 10th Division.

Khan had been nominated to become the first local Commander in Chief (C-in-C) of the Pakistan Army after General Douglas David Gracey's retirement. He was senior to later Commander-in-Chief and dictator Ayub Khan.

In Ayub Khan's book, "Friends, not masters", he says "the British were backing Major General Iftikhar and that he was short tempered and difficult to get on with."

Death
Before Khan could take up his new post, on 13 December 1949, at 10pm PST, he was killed, along with Brigadier Sher Khan and 24 others, in a Pakistan Airways Dakota plane crash.

The plane was flying from Lahore to Karachi when it crashed at Karo Jabal, near Malmari Jalalji Village, Thatta, 102 kilometers from Karachi and several miles away from the nearest rescue base in Jungshahi.

Khan was on the way to Karachi to proceed to England for a course at the Imperial Defence College (IDC).

References

Bibliography

Further reading 
 Barua, Pradeep. The Army Officer Corps and Military Modernisation in Later Colonial India
 Sharma, Gautam. Nationalisation of the Indian Army

External links
 The Quaid: Pakistan’s Tom Paine or Thomas Jefferson? By Mohammad Ashraf Chaudhry

1907 births
1949 deaths
Pakistani generals
British Indian Army officers
Indian Army personnel of World War II
People from Chakwal District
Graduates of the Royal Military College, Sandhurst
Victims of aviation accidents or incidents in 1949
Victims of aviation accidents or incidents in Pakistan